The Roman Catholic Diocese of Luebo is a suffragan diocese in the Ecclesiastical province of Kananga in the Democratic Republic of the Congo.

Its cathedral episcopal see is Cathédrale Saint-Jean-Baptiste (dedicated to John the Baptist), and it has a former cathedral: Cathédrale Sacré-Coeur (dedicated to the Sacred Heart), also in the city of Luebo.

History 
 Established on April 25, 1959 as Apostolic Vicariate of Luebo, on territory split off from the Apostolic Vicariate of Luluabourg
 November 10, 1959: Promoted as Diocese of Luebo
 On 26 September 1967, it gained territory from the Metropolitan Archdiocese of Luluabourg

Episcopal ordinaries
(all Latin Rite)

 Apostolic Vicar of Luebo 
 Joseph Ngogi Nkongolo (1959.04.25 – 1959.11.10 see below), Titular Bishop of Lebedus (1959.04.25 – 1959.11.10)

 Suffragan Bishops of Luebo 
 Joseph Ngogi Nkongolo (see above 1959.11.10 – 1966.05.03), also Apostolic Administrator of the then Apostolic Administration of Mbuji-Mayi (Congo-Kinshasa) (1963 – 1966.05.03), promoted Bishop of the same Mbujimayi (1966.05.03 – 1991)
 François Kabangu wa Mutela (1967.09.26 – 1987.12.10)
 Archbishop (personal title) Emery Kabongo Kanundowi (1987.12.10 – 2003.08.14), also Apostolic Administrator of Mweka (Congo-Kinshasa) (1988 – 1989.01.19); previously 1982- 10 December 1987 Second private Secretary of Pope John Paul II (first African to hold such post) 
 Pierre-Célestin Tshitoko Mamba (2006.01.07 - ... )

See also 
 Roman Catholicism in the Democratic Republic of the Congo

Sources and external links
 GCatholic.org with incumbent biography links
 Catholic Hierarchy

Roman Catholic dioceses in the Democratic Republic of the Congo
Christian organizations established in 1959
Roman Catholic dioceses and prelatures established in the 20th century
Roman Catholic Ecclesiastical Province of Kananga